John Waldron may refer to:
John Waldron (police officer) (1910–1975), commissioner of the London Metropolitan Police from 1968 to 1972
John C. Waldron (1900–1942), American torpedo squadron commander killed at the Battle of Midway
Jack Waldron (basketball) (John J. Waldron, died 1971), American brewery executive and president of the Boston Celtics from 1965 to 1967 and 1968 to 1970
John Waldron (died 1579), merchant from Tiverton, Devon, England
John Waldron (lawyer), lawyer based in Allentown, Pennsylvania
John Waldron (politician), member of the Oklahoma House of Representatives